Caryl Righetti (born 18 July 1984) is a footballer from Switzerland who plays as midfielder. He last played for FC Luzern in the Swiss Super League.

References

External links 

1984 births
Swiss men's footballers
Living people
FC Luzern players
Neuchâtel Xamax FCS players
Association football midfielders